Plaza Theatre, also known as the Capitol Theater or West Virginia State University Capitol Center, is a historic theatre building located at Charleston, West Virginia. It was constructed about 1912 and is a turn-of-the-century theater/commercial/office building located in a transitional business district of downtown Charleston. The three-story brick structure is characterized by eclectic Classical Revival style architecture incorporating a number of elements from classical Greek forms.
The theater's streetfront entrance is flanked by two commercial storefronts. The dimensions of the Capitol Theater building are 53 feet wide by 163 feet deep (16 by 50 m).

It was listed on the National Register of Historic Places in 1985.

References

Buildings and structures in Charleston, West Virginia
Neoclassical architecture in West Virginia
National Register of Historic Places in Charleston, West Virginia
Office buildings on the National Register of Historic Places in West Virginia
Theatres completed in 1912
Theatres on the National Register of Historic Places in West Virginia
1912 establishments in West Virginia